Shigeki (written: 茂樹, 茂喜, 茂輝, 繁樹, 重喜 or 成樹) is a masculine Japanese given name. Notable people with the name include:

, Japanese baseball player
, Japanese model and actor
, Japanese footballer
, Japanese golfer
, Japanese modern pentathlete
, Japanese businessman and politician
, Japanese video game designer
, Japanese educator and writer
, Japanese mixed martial artist
, Japanese politician
, better known as Dick Togo, Japanese professional wrestler
Shigeki Toyoshima (born 1971), Japanese high jumper
, Japanese footballer
, Japanese baseball player
, Japanese Paralympic athlete

Fictional characters
, character in the manga series Magical Girl Pretty Sammy
, character in the anime series Whistle!

Japanese masculine given names